KFL or kfl may refer to:

 Kerala Football League, a defunct Indian league competition conducted by Kerala Football Association
 kfl, the ISO 639-3 code for Kung language, Cameroon